Nicrophorus antennatus is a species of burying beetle, first described scientifically by Edmund Reitter in 1884. It has a wide distribution across the Palearctic and occurs between central Europe, China, and India.

References

Silphidae
Beetles described in 1884